The 2016–17 season saw Glasgow Warriors compete in the Guinness Pro12, and the European Champions Cup.

Season Overview

Coaching changes

The season began for Glasgow Warriors when it was announced that this 2016–17 season was to be the last in Head Coach's Gregor Townsend tenure. Townsend was announced to be taking over the Scotland Head Coach role from Vern Cotter in the summer of 2017.

Two days later, the SRU quickly named Townsend's successor, New Zealand coach, Dave Rennie, the Head Coach of the Super Rugby side the Chiefs. The Chiefs had won the Super Rugby title twice under Rennie's guidance.

Jason O'Halloran and Jonathan Humphreys were later also announced to be joining the Warriors for the 2017–18 season.

New pitch

To forestall the problems of the 2015–16 season when Scotstoun became unplayable due to flooding, a new 4G pitch was unveiled at Scotstoun Stadium.

Season targets

Since this was to be Head Coach Gregor Townsend's last season with the Warriors, a decent European run was a key target. The Warriors had never before qualified for the quarter finals of the European Champions Cup.

The Pro12 began in season 2011–12. And - in every single year since - Glasgow Warriors had made the play-offs to contest the championship in its last weeks. This was another target in this season.

The 1872 Cup was held by Edinburgh Rugby for the last two seasons, despite Glasgow finishing above Edinburgh in the Pro12 league in every year of Townsend's reign. Glasgow wanted the cup back west.

Season results

A mixed season saw the team qualify for European Champions Cup Quarter Final for the first time but lose out to eventual champions Saracens.

The Warriors qualified for the 2017-18 European Champions Cup but missed out for the first time for a Pro12 play-off place. Both the Autumn International and Six Nations windows proved particularly challenging this season.

The 1872 Cup was won by the Warriors but they lost their home match to Edinburgh for the first time on Glasgow soil.

Townsend era

The Gregor Townsend era for Glasgow Warriors ran for 5 years. In that time he guided the team to the 2014-15 Pro12 title and a European Champions Cup Quarter Final for the first time in 2016–17. Aside from this season, the team made the Pro12 play-offs in every year of his reign.

Team

Coaches

 Head coach:  Gregor Townsend
 Assistant coach:   Matt Taylor
 Assistant coach:   Kenny Murray
 Assistant coach:   Dan McFarland
 Assistant coach:   Mike Blair
 Lead Strength and Conditioning Coach:  Stuart Yule
 Asst. Strength and Conditioning Coach:  Thibault Giroud
 Asst. Strength and Conditioning Coach:  George Petrakos
 Lead Performance Analyst: Gavin Vaughan
 Asst. Performance Analyst: Greg Woolard

Staff

 Managing Director: Nathan Bombrys
 Chairman: Charles Shaw
 Advisory Group: Walter Malcolm, Douglas McCrea, Alan Lees, Jim Preston, Paul Taylor
 Rugby Operations Manager: John Manson
 Kit manager & Masseur: Dougie Mills
 Clinical Manager: Lisa Casey
 Team physiotherapist: Nicola McGuire
 Rehabilitation Physiotherapist: Gabrielle McCullough
 Team doctor: Dr. David Pugh
 Commercial Operations Manager: Alastair Kellock
 Communications Manager: Jeremy Bone
 Communications Asst: Jack Reid
 Operations manager: Stephanie Karvelis
 Marketing and Partnerships Manager: Darroch Ramsay
 Partnership Sales Manager: Laura Hynd
 Partnership Account Manager: Oliver Norman
 Partnership Account Manager: Jim Taylor
 Game On Project Development Officer: Lindsey Smith
 Community Rugby Coach: Stuart Lewis

Squad

BT Sport Scottish Rugby Academy Stage 3 players

Scottish Rugby Academy players who have been assigned to a Professional club are Stage 3 players. These players were assigned to Glasgow Warriors for the season 2016-17.

Academy players promoted in the course of the season are listed with the main squad.

  Cameron Fenton - Prop / Hooker
  Jamie Bhatti - Prop
  Callum Hunter-Hill - Lock
  Sam Thomson - Lock
  Bruce Flockhart - Flanker
  Matt Fagerson - No. 8

  George Horne - Scrum half
  Patrick Kelly - Centre
  Robert Beattie - Wing

Back up players

Other players used by Glasgow Warriors over the course of the season.

  Josh Henderson (Glasgow Hawks) - Scottish Rugby Academy Stage 2 player - Fly-half
  Shaun MacDonald (Stirling County) - Flanker
  Alex Taylor (Stirling County) - Number Eight
  Peter McCallum (Ayr) - Number Eight
  Rob McAlpine (Ayr) - Lock
  Adam Nicol (Stirling County) - Prop
  Kiran McDonald - (Glasgow Hawks) - Lock

Player statistics

During the 2016–17 season, Glasgow have used 57 different players in competitive games. The table below shows the number of appearances and points scored by each player.

Staff movements

Coaches

Promotions

  Mike Blair

Personnel In

  Thibault Giroud

Personnel Out

Player movements

Academy promotions

  Matt Smith from Scottish Rugby Academy
  Lewis Wynne from Scottish Rugby Academy

Player transfers

In

  Corey Flynn from  Toulouse
  Leonardo Sarto from  Zebre
  Nemia Kenatale from  Farul Constanța
  Tjiuee Uanivi from  Sharks
  Hagen Schulte from  Marist Albion
 
  Ruaridh MacKenzie from  Bond University RFC
  Brian Alainu'uese from  Waikato Rugby Union
  Ratu Tagive from  Eastern Suburbs
 
  Brandon Thomson from  Stormers (loan)

Out

  Duncan Weir to  Edinburgh Rugby
  Glenn Bryce to  Edinburgh Rugby
  Kevin Bryce to  Edinburgh Rugby
  Leone Nakarawa to  Racing 92
  Jerry Yanuyanutawa released
  Tyrone Holmes released
  Will Bordill to  Ayr
  Shalva Mamukashvili released
  Fergus Scott to  Currie
  Gregor Hunter to  Gala
  Javan Sebastian released
  Taqele Naiyaravoro to  NSW Waratahs
  Kieran Low released
  Hugh Blake to  Bay of Plenty (loan)
 
 
 
  Ryan Grant to  Worcester Warriors
  Jarrod Firth to  Grenoble
  Brandon Thomson to  Stormers (loan ends)
  Langilangi Haupeakui released
  Rory Clegg to  Ealing Trailfinders

Competitions

Pre-season and friendlies

Match 1

Harlequins: 15. Aaron Morris 14. Ross Chisholm 13. Joe Marchant 12. Jamie Roberts 11. Tim Visser 10. Nick Evans 9. Danny Care (C)1. Joe Marler 2. Rob Buchanan 3. Kyle Sinckler 4. Sam Twomey 5. James Horwill 6. Chris Robshaw 7. Luke Wallace 8. Jack Clifford
Replacements from Dave Ward, Cameron Holenstein, Will Collier, George Merrick, Charlie Matthews, Mat Luamanu, Charlie Mulchrone,Ruaridh Jackson, Jonas Mikalcius, Winston Stanley, James Chisholm

Glasgow Warriors: 15. Fraser Lyle 14. Leonardo Sarto 13. Nick Grigg 12. Sam Johnson 11. Rory Hughes 10. Rory Clegg 9. Grayson Hart1. Ryan Grant 2. James Malcolm 3. D'Arcy Rae 4. Tim Swinson 5. Scott Cummings 6. Rob Harley (C) 7. Simone Favarro 8. Lewis WynneReplacements (all used): Alex Dunbar, Ali Price, Callum Hunter-Hill,  Djustice Sears-Duru,  Hagen Schulte, Junior Bulumakau, Pat MacArthur, Richie Vernon, Tjiuee Uanivi and Zander Fagerson.

Match 2

Gloucester: 15. Tom Marshall, 14. Charlie Sharples, 13. Matt Scott, 12. Billy Twelvetrees, 11. Henry Purdy, 10. Billy Burns, 9. Greig Laidlaw (C) 1.Yann Thomas, 2. Richard Hibbard, 3. John Afoa, 4. Joe Latta, 5. Mariano Galarza, 6. Ross Moriarty, 7. Matt Kvesic, 8. Ben Morgan
Replacements from Darren Dawidiuk, Paddy McAllister, Paul Doran-Jones; Tom Denton; Lewis Ludlow, Callum Braley, James Hook; Mark Atkinson, Alex Craig, Dan Thomas, Andy Symons, Gareth Evans, Elliott Creed, Lloyd Evans, David Halaifonua, Charlie Beckett

Glasgow Warriors: 15. Rory Hughes. 14. Leonardo Sarto, 13. Alex Dunbar, 12. Sam Johnson, 11. Sean Lamont, 10. Peter Horne9. Henry Pyrgos (C), 1. Gordon Reid, 2. Corey Flynn, 3. Zander Fagerson, 4. Greg Peterson, 5. Scott Cummings, 6. Rob Harley,7. Fraser Brown, 8. Ryan Wilson
Replacements: (used:) Ryan Grant, Pat MacArthur, Sila Puafisi, Tim Swinson, Tjiuee Uanivi, Simone Favaro, Lewis Wynne, Ali Price, Rory Clegg, Richie Vernon, Fraser Lyle, (unused:) D'Arcy Rae, Grayson Hart

Match 3

Glasgow Warriors: Peter Murchie (C), Junior Bulumakau (Robert Beattie, 41), Nick Grigg (Patrick Kelly*, 44), Fraser Lyle (Patrick Kelly*, 41-43), Lee Jones (rep:Rory Hughes, 41); Hagen Schulte (Josh Henderson*, 61), Nemia Kenatale (George Horne*, 7); Alex Allan (Rep: Jamie Bhatti, 49), James Malcolm (Cameron Fenton*, 41), D'Arcy Rae (Jarrod Firth, 49), Sam Thomson, Greg Peterson (Kiran McDonald, 49), Callum Hunter-Hill* (Shaun MacDonald, 41), Matt Fagerson*, Peter McCallum (Alex Taylor, 41).  [* Member of the BT Sport Scottish Rugby Academy]

Canada A: J Wilson-Ross (James Bay D Joyce, Dublin University, 68); K Lloyd (Mississauga Blues), M Samson (Calgary Saints, D Fraser, Ladysmith, 55), P Parfrey (Swilers), D Moor (Balmy Beach, S Hayward, Sydney, 68); R Povey (Bedford, G du Toit, UVIC Vikes, 30), G McRorie (Calgary Hornets, A McMullan, Sainte-Anne-de-Bellevue, 70); D Sears-Duru (Glasgow Warriors, A Luca, Burnaby Lake, 61), E Howard (Brantford Harlequins, A Mascott, UBC Thunderbirds, 38-41), R Kotlewski (Calgary Saints, C McClary, Port Alberni, 57), C Keys (UVic Vikes), K Baillie (Ohio, A Wadden, Oakville Crusaders, 63), A Cejvanovic (Burnaby Lake), N Dala (Castaway Wanderers, M Heaton, Darlington Mowden Park, 49), T Larsen.

Pro12

The Pro12 began this year with an away match for Glasgow Warriors at the defending champions Connacht, the club that had wrested the title from them the previous season. The Warriors players were eager for the match and secured a try bonus victory at Galway Sportgrounds; Peter Horne later said: "I think that really told when we finally played them in the first game of the season and hammered them. It was frustration about why we hadn't been able to do it at the end of last year."

The next match against Leinster saw Tommy Seymour run in four tries in another 5 pt victory for the Warriors. This set up an intriguing match away with another team that made a great start to the season, Cardiff Blues. The Blues saw out a tight match and the Warriors only managed a losing bonus point.

A returning Finn Russell, back from the freak injury he sustained at the end of season match against Connacht, started against Ulster. Again, the Warriors had to content themselves with a losing bonus point.

An away win against Newport Gwent Dragons and two bonus point wins against Italian sides Treviso and Zebre put the Warriors in a good place before the Autumn Internationals. The Warriors then lost fifteen of their players to Scotland duty. In addition to losing an entire XV worth of players to the Scotland team, another three Warriors were also asked to train with the squad; Ali Price, Nick Grigg and Rory Hughes. Another four international players Simone Favaro, Nemia Kenatale, Djustice Sears-Duru and Langilangi Haupeakui were quickly called up for their respective nations before Sila Puafisi was then called up to play for Tonga.

This, in addition to a rapidly growing injury list that meant Leonardo Sarto, Richie Vernon, Ryan Grant, Adam Ashe, Greg Peterson, Scott Cummings, Tjiuee Uanivi and Chris Fusaro were all sidelined, really tested the Warriors strength in depth.

It was not then perhaps too surprising that in the Autumn International window the Warriors lost both matches against the Scarlets and the Ospreys. The run of defeats continued with a one-point loss to Munster at the start of December.

Over the winter period, with the international players all returning, the Warriors once again began winning matches. A healthy lead in the first leg of the 1872 Cup against Edinburgh then led to wins against Treviso and Cardiff Blues.

Then came the Six Nations window. Again the Warriors players provided the vast majority of the Scotland national team. Once again the Warriors strength and depth became an issue: three losses to Scarlets, Ulster and Ospreys in succession left Glasgow Warriors now trailing in the league behind those same teams battling for a play-off place.

Again the international players returned and results improved. Wins against Newport Gwent Dragons, Connacht and Zebre provided a belated challenge for a top 4 place, but losses to Munster and ultimately Leinster put paid to Glasgow's hopes of once again being involved in challenging for the title.

The Leinster defeat on 28 April 2017 meant that Glasgow Warriors finally lost its proud record of being the only team that had qualified for a top 4 place in every year of the Pro12's existence since it started in season 2011–12. The match at the RDS in Dublin proved bizarre; the match was topsy-turvy with Leinster initially leading before the Warriors took control. Leinster edged ahead with a penalty and then almost immediately the stadium lights went out. It looked like the Dublin side would win the match by the abandonment rule but the referee waited around 20 minutes before the lights came back on and Leinster managed to see out the remainder of the match.

One more Pro12 match remained to play. The 2nd leg of the 1872 Cup against Edinburgh Rugby at Scotstoun Stadium. Glasgow was eager to return the cup back to the west after Edinburgh had wrested the cup from Glasgow two seasons before. Edinburgh Rugby won the match - the first time that they had tasted victory on Glasgow soil in the 1872 Cup fixture - but they couldn't overturn the margin that the Warriors had built up in the away match at Murrayfield Stadium.

Glasgow Warriors won the 1872 Cup for a seventh time; a bittersweet win that ended Gregor Townsend's last match in charge of the Glasgow side.

League table

Results

Round 1

Round 2

Round 3

Round 4

Round 5

Round 6

Round 7

Round 8

Round 9

Round 10

Round 11 - 1872 Cup 1st Leg

Round 12

Round 13

Round 14

Round 15

Round 16

Round 17

Round 18

Round 19

Round 20

Round 21

Round 22 - 1872 Cup 2nd Leg

Glasgow Warriors won the 1872 Cup with an aggregate score of 43 - 41.

Europe

Glasgow Warriors were placed in Pool 1 of the European Champions Cup. They were drawn against last year's finalists Racing 92 and past winners Munster and Leicester Tigers.

As it was announced that this would be Gregor Townsend's last season with the Warriors, one huge focus for the season would be for Glasgow to get out of the pool stages and qualify for a Quarter Final.

Glasgow's previous best in the Heineken Cup was a Quarter Final play-off in 1997 where they lost to Leicester Tigers. This season's Tigers were first up in the Pool stage.

The match at Scotstoun resulted in a 42 - 13 win for the Warriors with the Glasgow side running in five tries.

The untimely death of Munster coach Anthony Foley meant that Munster's match with Racing 92 was postponed. This meant that Munster's next match would be against Glasgow Warriors at an emotionally charged Thomond Park. Foley's sad passing away seemed to galvanise the Munster side together and they ran out 38 - 17 victors in a difficult match for all involved.

A tough double header against last year's finalists was next up for the Warriors. Racing 92 boasted New Zealand fly-half Dan Carter and former Glasgow Warrior favourite Leone Nakarawa in their ranks. Yet the Glasgow side crushed the French side in Paris with Townsend describing the victory as the second best of his Warriors coaching career after the 2014-15 Pro12 final against Munster.

The home tie proved the Paris result no fluke as another 'special night' at Scotstoun showed the Warriors dominate the Racing side. In particular Finn Russell's outplaying of Dan Carter in back to back matches thrust the Scotland fly-half into Lions contention.

Townsend was quoted: "Finn deserved to be in the Lions conversation before the games against Racing but he’s playing with lots of confidence and parts of his game have got really strong over the last couple of years. Finn’s been up against Dan Carter and a lot of other big players in big environments, too. He’s started at Scotland at stand-off for the last two-and-a-half years so even though British & Irish rugby is full of quality players, I expect him to be in the mix."

A still emboldened Munster came to Scotstoun and ground out a very tight win. Only 3 points separated the sides on the night.

The last Pool 1 game for Glasgow was at Welford Rd in Leicester. The Warriors went down to Leicester with purpose and simply mauled the Tigers, handing out the Tigers worst result in European history.

The Tigers failed to score and Glasgow ran in 6 tries in a famous 43 - 0 victory. By the end of the match Glasgow Warriors pushed for the 50 pts in the Tiger's 22. Leicester's Freddie Burns was tackled and the ball about to be turned over, Burns had to embarrassingly reach out for the touchline to end the match to avoid further Warriors score. Glasgow Warriors became the first Scottish team to beat Leicester at home since the Fettesian-Lorettonian Club managed it 112 years before when they won by a try to nil in 28 December 1905 with Jobson scoring the 3 points.

Glasgow Warriors thus qualified for a European Champions Cup Quarter Final for the first time in their history. The question now was... could they go even further?

The Warriors drew Saracens away from home. As the reigning European champions, Sarries were heavy favourites. Still 6000 of the Warrior Nation went to London and provided the Aviva Premiership team with their highest ever home attendance at Allianz Park.

The first half proved tighter than expected as a few attempted tries by Saracens were ruled out for infringements - but the London club still led. A blow for the Warriors came when captain Jonny Gray was taken off injured early on. Returning from injury in his first game back Greg Peterson tried to manfully cover his absence.

The second half started brightly for the Warriors and a try by Lee Jones brought a period of Warriors dominance. However a missed kick to touch by Finn Russell to consolidate the Warriors pressure into a lead proved the turning point in the match and the Saracens then turned the screw and started running in tries. A consolation try at the end by Ryan Wilson was the Warriors only reply.

Townsend later was to blame himself for the defeat stating that he had over-analysed the Saracens side and thus prevented Glagow from playing their own game: "Nothing might have worked, because Saracens are so good, but I got it wrong"

Despite the loss the huge Warrior Nation support made many friends and Glasgow Warriors were now firmly on the European rugby map. Saracens would go on to lift the European Champions title again beating Clermont in the final at Murrayfield Stadium.

Pool

Results

Round 1

Round 2

Round 3

Round 4

Round 5

Round 6

Quarter-finals

Warrior of the month awards

End of Season awards

Competitive debuts this season

A player's nationality shown is taken from the nationality at the highest honour for the national side obtained; or if never capped internationally their place of birth. Senior caps take precedence over junior caps or place of birth; junior caps take precedence over place of birth. A player's nationality at debut may be different from the nationality shown. Combination sides like the British and Irish Lions or Pacific Islanders are not national sides, or nationalities.

Players in BOLD font have been capped by their senior international XV side as nationality shown.

Players in Italic font have capped either by their international 7s side; or by the international XV 'A' side as nationality shown.

Players in normal font have not been capped at senior level.

A position in parentheses indicates that the player debuted as a substitute. A player may have made a prior debut for Glasgow Warriors in a non-competitive match, 'A' match or 7s match; these matches are not listed.

Tournaments where competitive debut made:

Crosshatching indicates a jointly hosted match.

Sponsorship

 BT Sport - Title Sponsor
 Scottish Power - Official Kit and Community Sponsor

Official Kit Supplier

 Macron

Official Kit Sponsors

 Malcolm Group
 McCrea Financial Services
 Denholm Oilfield
 Ross Hall Hospital
 Story Contracting

Official Sponsors

 The Famous Grouse
 Clyde Travel Management
 Harper Macleod
 Caledonia Best
 Eden Mill Brewery and Distillery
 David Lloyd Leisure
 Crabbie's
 CALA Homes
 Capital Solutions
 Martha's Restaurant

Official Partners

 Barrs
 Glasgow Airport
 Cameron House
 People Make Glasgow
 Smile Plus
 Lucozade Sport
 Lenco Utilities
 HF Group
 Scot JCB News Scotland
 G4S
 MSC Nutrition
 Healthspan Elite
 Primestaff
 The Crafty Pig
 Village Hotel Club
 Land Rover

References

2016-17
2016–17 in Scottish rugby union
2016–17 Pro12 by team
2016–17 European Rugby Champions Cup by team